The Women's Revelations Cup is an international invitational women's football tournament organized by the Mexican Football Federation that is held in Mexico. The tournament was announced to the public on 20 July 2022, and the first edition (2022) was held in the City of León, Guanajuato from 31 August – 6 September 2022, contested by four nations that were preparing for the 2022 FIFA U-17 Women's World Cup in India: Canada, Chile, Colombia, and host Mexico. Beginning with the 2023 edition, the tournament will include senior women's national teams.  

The Women's Revelations Cup is a tournament similar to the Algarve Cup, the Arnold Clark Cup, the Cup of Nations, the Cyprus Women's Cup, the Istria Cup, the Pinatar Cup, the SheBelieves Cup, the Tournoi de France and the Turkish Women's Cup.

The current champion is Mexico, who won the 2023 edition.

Tournament Format
The four invited teams play in a round-robin tournament. Points awarded in the group stage followed the formula of three points for a win, one point for a draw, and zero points for a loss. A tie in points would be decided by goal differential; other tie-breakers are used as needed in the following order: goal difference, goals scored, head-to-head result, and a fair play score based on the number of yellow and red cards.

Results

Participating nations

References

2022 establishments in Mexico
February sporting events
International women's association football invitational tournaments
International women's association football competitions hosted by Mexico